The Benning Heights–Alabama Avenue Line, designated Route V7, V8, is a daily bus route operated by the Washington Metropolitan Area Transit Authority between Minnesota Avenue station of the Orange Line of the Washington Metro and Congress Heights station (V7) of the Green Line of the Washington Metro or the neighborhood of Benning Heights (H & 46th Streets SE) (V8). The line operates every 25-30 minutes at all times. Route V7 trips are roughly 45 minutes while route V8 trips are roughly 15 minutes.

Background
Routes V7 and V8 operate between Minnesota Avenue station and Benning Heights/Congress Heights station providing service in Benning Heights. Route V7 operates during rush hours between Minnesota Avenue and Congress Heights, skipping the Benning Heights loop, while route V8 operates between Minnesota Avenue and Benning Heights only at all times, running along the Benning Heights loop.

Route V7 operates out of Southern Avenue division with a few trips operated from Shepherd Parkway, while route V8 operates out of Southern Avenue during the weekdays and Bladensburg during the weekends.

History

Route U8
Route U8 originally operated as a different route but was replaced by an extended route V4 when the Orange Line began operation. 

The U8 was created on December 28, 1991 as the Capitol Heights–Benning Heights Line The new U8 replace the segment of the X2's original routing, as well as routes X4 and X6 between the Minnesota Avenue station & Capitol Heights stations, via Minnesota Avenue NE, Nannie Helen Burroughs Avenue NE, 58th Street NE, Dix Street NE, Eastern Avenue NE, 63rd Street NE, Southern Avenue NE/SE, and Davey Street. Routes X4 and X6 was fully discontinued and route X2 was shorten to operate between Lafayette Square to Minnesota Avenue station.

Route U8 would also operate through an additional loop between Minnesota Avenue station & Benning Heights, via Minnesota Avenue NE, Benning Road NE/SE, E Street SE, Alabama Avenue SE, H Street SE, Benning Road SE/NE, & Minnesota Avenue NE, as a loop before returning Northbound. It would be only during the loop between the Minnesota Avenue station & Benning Heights, which the U8 would serve Benning Road station and would not serve the station when operating between the Minnesota Avenue & Capitol Heights. Its order of terminus goes as follows: Capitol Heights to Minnesota Avenue then Minnesota Avenue to Benning Heights, then reverse.

Route V7, V8, V9

Routes V7, V8, and V9 operated as part of the Minnesota Avenue-M Street Line. Route V7 operated between Deanwood station and the Bureau of Engraving operating daily with some late night trips terminating at Navy Yard–Ballpark station, route V8 only operated on weekends running between Archives station (9th St & Constitution Ave NW) and Deanwood station, and route V9 only operated during weekday peak-hour periods between Benning Heights (H St & 45th Pl SE) and Navy Yard-Ballpark station.

Changes
During WMATA's FY2015 budget, a study was announced on the U and V lines from Minnesota Avenue station. For route U8, it goes as the following:
 Route U8 would no longer serve the portion of the current route between Capitol Heights station and Minnesota Avenue station, which would be replaced by Routes U2 and V7.
 Route U8: Daily service at all times via the portion of the current route between Minnesota Avenue station and Benning Heights, with some trips extended to Congress Heights station via Alabama Avenue.
 Route U8 would no longer serve the portion of the current route between Capitol Heights station and Minnesota Avenue station.
 The portion of the current U8 between Capitol Heights station and Minnesota Avenue station via Nannie Helen Burroughs Avenue would be served by proposed changes to Routes U2 and V7, V8.
 Routes V7, V8: Daily service at all times between Capitol Heights station and Navy Yard–Ballpark station via the current U8 route between Capitol Heights station and Minnesota Avenue station, then via the current V7 route to Navy Yard Ballpark station.
 Route V9: Peak period service between Benning Heights and Bureau of Engraving via the current V9 route between Benning Heights and Navy Yard Ballpark station, then via the current V7 route to Bureau of Engraving.
 Routes V7 and V8 would no longer serve the portion of the current routes between Deanwood Station and Minnesota Avenue Station, which would be replaced by proposed route U4 reroute.

The rerouting was to improve reliability of service by operating shorter routes and create a better balance of capacity and demand throughout the line. Performance measures has an on-time performance is 72 percent compared to the target of 81 percent for route U8. For routes V7, V8, and V9, the reason was for enhance connectivity between points of regional demand, create a better balance of capacity and demand lines serving the Minnesota Avenue station, and reduce or eliminate service with low productivity. Approximately 700 of 5,300 (13%) weekday passenger trips, 750 of 3,200 (23%) Saturday passenger trips and 600 of 2,900 (21%) Sunday passenger trips would possibly be affected by shortening routes V7 and V8 at Navy Yard Station. Weekday passengers affected may be less due to the proposed extension of route V9.

On June 21, 2015, route U8 was shorten to only operate between the Minnesota Avenue station & Benning Heights (H Street SE & Benning Road SE) only. The segment of U8's routing between the Minnesota Avenue & Capitol Heights station was discontinued, was replaced by brand new routes V2 & V4, As a result of the change, U8 was renamed the Benning Heights Line. Also, routes V7 and V8 were replaced by routes V2 and V4 while route V9 was renamed route V1.

During WMATA Fiscal Year of 2018 budget, it was proposed to extend every other U8 weekday peak-hour trip to Congress Heights station via Benning Road and Alabama Avenue SE skipping the Benning Heights loop in order to relieve Route W4 overcrowding and respond to customer demand on portions of Alabama Avenue SE and Benning Road. The combined weekday rush hour frequency of routes U8 and W4 between East Capitol Street & Benning Road and Congress Heights would be improved from every 12-15 minutes to every 7-8 minutes in response to customer demand and crowding. The performance measures goes as follows:

If the proposal goes through, it will be implemented as soon as December 2017.

On June 24, 2018, route U8 was renamed route V8 which will operate on the U8's current routing between Minnesota Avenue station and Benning Heights at all times. Also, a new route V7 was created to operate between Minnesota Avenue station and Congress Heights station during weekday peak-hours only to help out route W4. The line was then renamed to the Benning Heights–Alabama Avenue Line as of result to the new routing.

During the COVID-19 pandemic, all route V7 service was suspended and V8 was reduced to its Saturday supplemental schedule on March 16, 2020. However beginning on March 18, 2020, route V8 was further reduced to operate on its Sunday schedule. Weekend service was also suspended beginning on March 21, 2020. On August 23, 2020, additional service was added to the V8 while also resuming weekend service but route V7 remained suspended. 

On September 26, 2020, WMATA proposed to eliminate all route V7 service due to low federal funding and replace them with route V8 trips. Route V7 has not operated since March 13, 2020 due to Metro's response to the COVID-19 pandemic. However on March 14, 2021, all route V7 service was restored and route V8 service was restored to its pre-pandemic schedule.

In February 2021 during the FY2022 budget, WMATA proposed to eliminate the entire line if WMATA did not get any federal funding.

References

V7